Medical examination of the male genitals may be undertaken to detect various ailments, or to verify a person's age or biological sex.

Procedure
For the male genital examination, the exposure of the groin and genital area with adequate lighting is required. The ideal position is with the professional sitting in front of the patient. The examination may take place with the patient sitting or in supine position, but to investigate possible varicocele and hernia it is necessary that the patient is standing in front of the examiner. In a genital examination, the doctor can detect abnormalities such as phimosis, lumps, tumors, redness, excoriation, edema, lesions, swelling, cancer and many others.

Areas for inspection and palpation
 Pubic region
 Penis
 Glans
 Scrotum
 Testicles and epididymis

Other purposes
Outside of the medical scope, there may also be social reasons for conducting genital examinations. For instance child refugees from Syria have had their genitals examined in some European countries in order to determine their age. There have also been proposals by some lawmakers to initiate genital inspections in bathrooms at schools in response to a debate over which bathrooms should be used by transgender or intersex students.

See also
 Pelvic examination - female genital examination

References

Male genital procedures